Baba Yogendra (7 January 1924 – 10 June 2022) was an Indian artist, pracharak (campaigner) for Rashtriya Swayamsevak Sangh (RSS) and one of the founding members of Sanskar Bharti. He was conferred with Padma Shri, India's fourth highest civilian award, in 2018 in the field of arts.

Early life 
Baba Yogendra was born on 7 January 1924 in Gandhinagar, Basti district in United Provinces of British India (now in Uttar Pradesh). He was educated in Gorakhpur.

Association with Sanskar Bharti 
Yogendra campaigned for RSS in Gorakhpur, Allahabad, Bareilly, Budaun and Sitapur. In 1981, RSS created Sanskar Bharti, a unit to promote arts and literature. Yogendra was one of the founding members. He established himself as one of the senior pracharaks (campaigners) for RSS.

Awards 
In 2018, the Government of India conferred him with Padma Shri award in arts, the fourth highest civilian award of the country.

Death 
On 11 May 2022, Yogendra suffered a cardiac arrest while he was in Gorakhpur and was admitted in Medanta Hospital the next day. On 27 May, he was moved to Ram Manohar Lohia Hospital in Lucknow for further treatment. On 10 June, he died at the hospital.

References 

1924 births
2022 deaths
People from Basti district
Rashtriya Swayamsevak Sangh pracharaks
Recipients of the Padma Shri in arts